Ethan Ross may refer to:

Ethan Ross (footballer, born 2001), Scottish football striker
Ethan Ross (footballer, born 1997), English football goalkeeper